Jablance is a settlement in the Slovene Hills east of Maribor in northeastern Slovenia. The area is part of the traditional region of Styria. The municipality is now included in the Drava Statistical Region.

A number of Roman-era burial mounds have been identified near the settlement.

References

External links
Jablance at Geopedia

Populated places in the Municipality of Duplek